Skatval Station is a railway station located in the village of Skatval in the municipality of Stjørdal in Trøndelag county, Norway.  It is located along the Nordlandsbanen railway line. The station is served hourly by the Trøndelag Commuter Rail service to Steinkjer and Trondheim. The service is operated by SJ Norge. There is free parking at the station, but no ticket machine.

History

The station was opened on 29 October 1902 on the Hell–Sunnan Line between Hell Station and Levanger Station as the section to Levanger was finished. It was designed by Paul Due and was built with a surrounding park. The present station with two platforms is located a few hundred meters away from the old station, and the old station building was taken out of service.

References

Railway stations in Stjørdal
Railway stations on the Nordland Line
Railway stations opened in 1902
1902 establishments in Norway
National Romantic architecture in Norway
Art Nouveau railway stations